Mi Vida Sin Tu Amor (My Life Without Your Love) is a Latin Pop album by Cristian Castro released in 1999. It was nominated for Best Latin Pop Album of 2000.

Track listing 
 "Volver A Amar"
 "Tu Sombra En Mi"
 "Mi Vida Sin Tu Amor"
 "Por Amarte Así"
 "Más y Más"
 "Ángel"
 "Alguna Vez [Theme from the telenovela, Ángela]"
 "Si Me Ves Llorar Por Ti"
 "Vivir Sin Ti"
 "Verónica"

Charts

Sales and certifications

References 

1999 albums
Cristian Castro albums
Bertelsmann Music Group albums
Albums produced by Kike Santander